Václav Koutný (born 4 October 1991) is a Czech footballer who currently plays for FC Gießen.

References

External links
 SK Sigma Olomouc profile
 
 

1991 births
Living people
Czech footballers
Association football defenders
SK Sigma Olomouc players
Czech First League players
FK Senica players
Slovak Super Liga players
Hessenliga players
Regionalliga players
FC Gießen players
Expatriate footballers in Slovakia
Czech expatriate sportspeople in Slovakia
Expatriate footballers in Germany
Czech expatriate sportspeople in Germany
Place of birth missing (living people)